Banksia Grove is a forest in the Rocky Cape National Park on the north west coast of Tasmania, Australia. The name refers to the plant genus Banksia, which grows in the area.

References
 

Tasmanian forests
North West Tasmania